Stony Lonesome (also spelled Stoney Lonesome) is an unincorporated community in Harrison Township, Bartholomew County, in the U.S. state of Indiana.

History
Stony Lonesome was likely named on account of its rocky and isolated terrain. The community has been noted for its unusual place name.

Geography

References

Unincorporated communities in Bartholomew County, Indiana
Unincorporated communities in Indiana